Latifabad Tehsil was an administrative subdivision (tehsil) of Hyderabad District in the Sindh province of Pakistan. The city of Latifabad is the headquarters of the subdivision.

References

Hyderabad District, Pakistan
Talukas of Sindh